Strothers is the surname of the following people

Jimmie Strothers (1883–1942?), Americain folk musician
Joan Strothers (1916–1999), Welsh scientist on atomic bomb
Lamont Strothers (born in 1968), Americain basketball player
Tim Strothers (1879–1942), Americain baseball player

See also
Strother (disambiguation)
Struthers (disambiguation)